Holy Week in the Philippines is a significant religious observance for the country's Catholic majority, the Iglesia Filipina Independiente or the Philippine Independent Church and most Protestant groups. One of the few majority Christian countries in Asia, Catholics make up 80 percent of the population, and the Church is one of the country's dominant sociopolitical forces.

The solemn celebration begins on Friday of Sorrows turning to Palm Sunday and continues on through to Easter Sunday. Many communities observe Spanish-influenced Catholic rituals such as processions, that have been syncretised with elements of precolonial beliefs. This is evident in some ritual practices not sanctioned by the universal Church and the many superstitions associated with the occasion.

The days of the Easter Triduum (Maundy Thursday until Black Saturday) are considered statutory holidays. During this period, many businesses are closed or operate on shorter hours. Local terrestrial television and most radio stations usually go off the air (for annual maintenance of broadcast equipment), while others (such as stations owned by various denominations) shorten broadcasting hours and feature Lenten drama specials, religious and inspirational programming. Holy Week celebrations also receive wide news coverage of various services and rites. International cable television channels distributed to the Philippines, however, continue to broadcast their normal programming, while channels dedicated to horse racing, cockfighting and similar niche programming go off-air during the Triduum.

Holy Week in the Philippines is also highly anticipated as one of the annual long weekends in the country. Non-Catholics or non-practicing Catholics take this opportunity to go on vacations, resulting to a peak season in most Philippine tourist destinations.

Palm Sunday

On Palm Sunday (Linggo ng Palaspás, Domingo de Ramos, “Branches Sunday”), worshipers bear ornately woven palm fronds or palaspás to church for blessing by the priest before or after the day's Mass. The fronds (considered by the Church as sacramentals) are often brought home and placed on altars, doors, lintels or windows, in the belief that these can ward off demons, and avert both fires and lightning.

Some places hold a procession into the church before the service, a common starting point being an ermita/visita (chapel of ease) several blocks away. The presiding priest, vested in a stole and cope of red (the prescribed liturgical colour of the day), either walks the route or, in imitation of Jesus’ triumphal entry, is led on horseback to the church. Sometimes, a statue of Christ riding a donkey (known as the Humenta) is used instead.

Whether the priest himself or a statue is used to represent Christ, a custom is for women to cover the processional route with tapis (literally, “wraparound”), which are large, heirloom cloth skirts or aprons made exclusively for this ritual. This is to recall how excited Jerusalemites spread their cloaks before Christ as he entered the city.

Once the procession reaches the church or some other designated spot, children dressed as angels strew flowers and sing the day's processional antiphon, Hosanna Filio David (“Hosanna to the Son of David”). The antiphon's text, whether the Latin original or a vernacular translation, is sung to traditional hymn tunes.

The blessing of palms and the intonation of the antiphon often occurs in the church's parvise, its parking lot, or the town plaza, which usually is in front of or near the church (a common layout in most Philippine settlements).

Holy Monday and Holy Tuesday
On Holy Monday (Lunes Santo) and Holy Tuesday (Martes Santo), the major procession of the Journey to Calvary takes to the streets. The main figure is the Fallen Christ accompanied by the images of the saints present during Christ's walk to Calvary. There is St. Peter holding the heavenly keys, the beloved St. John, the Three Marys, St. Veronica with her white veil implanted with Christ's image, Mary Magdalene bearing small bottles of oil and perfume, and the Virgin of Sorrows. In some parts of the country where there is an abundance of wood as well as skilled craftsmen, life-size wooden images are constructed so that they are able to move their arms and heads like puppets. Holy Tuesday is a regular working day and is sometimes the last full one preceding half- or full-day holidays given by some private companies on Holy Wednesday.

Holy Wednesday
Holy Wednesday (Miyérkules Santo) is officially the last working day of the week. Private companies are free to give full or partial holidays to their employees. This lets people return to their home provinces for the Triduum, and holidaymakers to leave for their destinations, making it one of the country's busiest travel seasons.

In some parish, "Tenebrae" service usually held on Holy Wednesday that involves the gradual extinguishing of candles on a Tenebrae hearse, readings related to the Passion of Jesus, and the strepitus (loud noise).

In the evening, long processions depicting the Passion of Christ are held in towns throughout the provinces of Pampanga, Bulacan, Rizal, Laguna, and in the Ilocandia, as well as in Makati in Metro Manila.

Except in Baliwag and Pulilan, the Passion tableaux are excluded from the Good Friday afternoon procession.

Maundy Thursday

Maundy Thursday (Huwebes Santo) is the first statutory public holiday of the week and marks the beginning of the Paschal Triduum.

Prior to the Second Vatican Council, the Procession of the Passion of Christ was held on Maundy Thursday. This was later transferred to Holy Wednesday for Latin Rite Catholics, with the Philippine Independent Church (which separated from Rome in the early 20th century) retaining the Maundy Thursday date. Among the most famous processions of the Philippine Independent Church are those of Concepcion in Malabon, and Santa Cruz and Paete in Laguna.

The first rite of the day is the Chrism Mass, in which parishioners join their priest for morning Mass in the cathedral, especially in the large dioceses and archdioceses. The clergy on the day renew their priestly vows. This Mass, which is presided by the bishop of the diocese, is when the Chrism, oil of catechumens and the oil for the sick are consecrated after the homily. Priests then bring portions of the oils to their respective parishes after the service and store these for future use. However, in other dioceses where logistics and other valid reasons hamper gathering the clergy on this day, the Chrism Mass is held earlier in the week. An example is the Archdiocese of Lipa and the Diocese of Malolos where the Chrism Mass is held instead on Holy Tuesday.

The main observance of the day is the last Mass before Easter, the Evening Mass of the Lord's Supper. Though not mandatory, the afternoon service customarily includes a re-enactment of the Washing of the Feet of the Twelve Apostles. The service ends abruptly with a somber procession of the Blessed Sacrament, which is brought to the church's Altar of Repose. Churches remain open until midnight for those who want to venerate the Blessed Sacrament, with others going to one of several priests on standby to confess their sins.

One of the most important Holy Week traditions in the Philippines is the Visita Iglesia (Spanish for "church visit", also known as the Seven Churches Visitation). Throughout the day, worshipers pray the Stations of the Cross inside or outside the church, while at night, the faithful pay obeisance and perform supplications to the Blessed Sacrament within the Altar of Repose.

Good Friday

Good Friday (Biyernes Santo) is the second public holiday of the week, and considered the most solemn day of the year. It is observed with street processions, the Way of the Cross, sermons and prayers meditating on Jesus' Seven Last Words (“Siete Palabras”) and the staging of Senákulo, which in some places has already begun on Palm Sunday. The Baliwag Good Friday procession is the longest Lenten procession in the Philippines. Baliwag currently has 118 statues and scenes portraying the life of Christ. This activity is well-attended by both local and foreign tourists, and follows the main liturgical service of the day.

Mass is not celebrated on this day. Instead, people gather in churches in the afternoon for the Veneration of Cross service and the Mass of the Presanctified. Nationwide, the veneration service begins silently in unlit churches at 3:00 PM PST (GMT+8), remembering the “ninth hour” that was the instant Christ died according to the Gospels. The Mass of the Presanctified is said at the altar, which has been stripped of linens and decorations, and the priests omit the Anaphora as the sacramental bread was already consecrated on Maundy Thursday.

In some places (most famously in the province of Pampanga, where the day is known as Maleldo), processions include devotees who self-flagellate and sometimes even have themselves nailed to crosses. While frowned upon by the Church, devotees consider these to be personal expressions of penance, whether in fulfilment of a vow or in thanksgiving for a prayer granted. The San Fernando local government says these reenactments are regarded as a part of Pampanga's and the city's cultural heritage. Reenactments of Christ's crucifixion in the village began in 1958 but the first actual crucifixion took place four years later in 1962.
 Other penitents, called magdarame, carry wooden crosses, crawl on the rough and hot pavement, and slash their backs before whipping themselves to draw blood. This is done to ask for forgiveness of sins, to fulfill vows (panata), or to express gratitude for favours granted.
The pabasa, or continuous chanting of the Pasyón (the Filipino epic narrative of Christ's life, Passion, Death, and Resurrection), usually concludes on this day before 3:00 PM. Television and radio stations also broadcast their own special Siete Palabras programmes from large churches in Manila, usually beginning at noon so as to end before the veneration service.

Santo Entierro
The usual highlight of Good Friday is the Santo Entierro ("Holy Burial"), which is both the name of the rite itself and of the statue of the dead Christ that is its focus. Comparable to the Eastern Orthodox and Eastern Catholic practice of processing the epitaphios, the sculpted image of the Santo Entierro. Left bare or covered to the neck in a shroud of red, white, black, or gold, the image is laid in an ornate, flower-decked calandra or bier that is brought around in a funeral procession. The retinue is normally composed of images of saints connected to the Passion narrative, such as Peter, Mary Magdalene, and John the Evangelist. Tradition dictates that regardless of the number of images used in the procession, that of the Virgin Mary, dressed in black and gold as the mourning Mater Dolorosa, is always last and alone as a mark of importance.

Some places accord the Santo Entierro traditional, pre-Christian funeral rites such as washing the corpse, laying the body in state, or seating it in a funerary chair. In Pakil, Laguna the  Santo Entierro is smoked over burning lansones peelings: during the procession, the shoulder-borne calandra makes several stops, and each time is placed on rests above the burning peelings. At each stop, a band plays a hymn and afterwards a crier turns towards the bier and shouts three times in Spanish, "¡Señor! ¡Misericordia, Señor!" ("Lord! Mercy, Lord!"), which the congregation repeats in a low voice.

In Alimodian, Iloilo the Santo Entierro is interred – not by the altar as is customary elsewhere – but at the church doors for the people to venerate, usually by kissing the icon’s feet. There is also a large crucifix before the altar for people to venerate and kiss. Later that night, young girls in costume and bearing lit tapers, walk barefoot in a second procession with the Mater Dolorosa in a around the town plaza. The maidens meditate and mourn, representing Christ's female disciples accompanying the Virgin Mary.

Among the country's famous and elaborate calandaras are those of Agoo, Bacolor, Baliwag, Guagua, Molo, Iloilo, Paete, San Pablo, Sasmuan, Silay, and Vigan. Some are centuries old and were commissioned from the famous talleres (studios) of the santeros Asunción and Máximo Vicente. The image itself, meanwhile, is displayed the rest of the year in the church that owns it, or in the house of the family that cares for it.

Popular culture
Several traditional taboos are customarily observed on this day, such as the avoidance of excessive noisemaking, and in older times, bathing (except for health reasons). The prohibitions usually begin after 3:00 PM PST. Children, in particular, were traditionally discouraged from outdoor play, with elders cautioning that since “God is dead”, evil spirits are freely roaming the earth to harm humans.

The ritual mourning and generally sombre mood of the day gave rise to the Tagalog idiom “Mukhâ kang Biyernes Santo” (“You’ve a face like Good Friday.”) The phrase refers to a sad person's demeanor resembling that of the suffering Christ.

Black Saturday 
Black Saturday or Holy Saturday (Sábado de Gloria) is the third and final public holiday of the week. The day is legally and colloquially termed in English as “Black” given the colour's role in mourning. The term Sábado de Gloria (Spanish for Gloria Saturday) refers to the return of the Gloria in Excelsis Deo during the Easter Vigil held on this day. The hymn is absent throughout Lent except on solemnities and Maundy Thursday.

The ritual mourning for the “dead” Christ continues, albeit with less intensity. Traditional taboos from the previous day, such as merrymaking and the consumption of meat, are carried over and sometimes broken at noon. This includes swimming in a river or the sea, as superstition warns against bathing on Good Friday afternoon. Most commercial establishments operate on shorter hours, with smaller enterprises in many areas remaining closed until Easter Sunday or Easter Monday, but some return to normal in major urban areas. Television and radio stations broadcast on shorter hours with special programming, or remain off-air.

Easter Sunday
Easter (Linggo ng Pagkabuhay or Pasko ng Pagkabuhay) is marked with joyous celebrations, the first being the pre-dawn rite called Salubong in Filipino and Sugat in Cebuano and Hiligaynon (both calques of the rite's Spanish name Encuentro, "meeting"). The rite is customarily performed in the early hours of Easter before the first Mass. In some parishes, the rite is held earlier at midnight immediately after the long Easter Vigil proper, retaining the same format.

The ritual is meant to depict the apocryphal reunion of Christ and his Mother, the Virgin Mary, after the Resurrection. Statues of both are borne in two separate processions that converge at a designated area called a Galilea (“Galilee”), which is often an open space with a purpose-built scaffold (permanent or otherwise) near the church. Depending on the size and wealth of the congregation, the processions include statues of any or all the Myrrhbearers, particularly the Three Marys (Mary, mother of James, Mary Magdalene, and Mary Salome), along with Peter and John the Evangelist. By custom, the two processions are sex-segregated, with male worshipers following the Risen Christ, twelve men dressed as the Apostles, and icons of male saints, while female congregants accompany icons of the Virgin Mary and female saints. Those in the procession hold lit tapers, and often recite the rosary as a brass band plays hymns and joyful music.

The icon of the Virgin Mary, still called the Mater Dolorosa, is clothed or draped in a black veil (Tagalog: lambóng) to show her bereavement. An “angel” (often a small girl in costume) stands at or is suspended in mid-air from the Galilea. From this lofty perch, the angel chants the Regina Coeli in Latin or in the vernacular, sometimes accompanied by similarly dressed schoolchildren representing the angelic choirs.

The high point is when the principal angel dramatically removes the veil from the Virgin's icon, signalling the abrupt end to her grieving and the period of mourning. The veil may simply be pulled off the statue, or tied to balloons or doves that are released into the dawn sky. The sorrowing Virgin is ritually transformed into Nuestra Señora de Alegria ("Our Lady of Joy"); in celebratory veneration, the angels throw flower petals at the icons of the Christ and the Virgin as confetti rains down. The moment is punctuated by bells pealing, brass bands playing, and fireworks. The reunited congregation then gathers inside the church for the first Mass of Easter.

Notable observances and pilgrimage sites

Tondo, Manila
Caridad or Pakaridad is a way of giving or sharing food (especially ginataan or suman) to the neighbors or to the local church or chapel to be given to the crowds of people who attend the Good Friday procession. A complimentary drink of water is also given by local residents living along the processional route.

Black Nazarene
The Black Nazarene icon, brought from Mexico during the Galleon Trade era, is enshrined in Quiapo Church, and is considered miraculous by devotees is brought out for procession every Good Friday – one of three such occasions when this is done. The statue is borne on the shoulders of male devotees in a slow, difficult procession around the narrow streets of the district, a score of men struggle to keep the image moving on. Thousands more try to muscle their way to touch the icon as well as the long ropes in which the wheeled carriage carrying the image is pulled. The procession lasts the whole morning.

Amulet hunting
It is a folk belief that anting-anting (traditional amulets) are especially potent if collected, made, or imbued with power on Good Friday. In Sipalay, Negros Occidental many albularyo (witch doctors) search for anting-anting in unexplored caves. There is a particular type of anting-anting for every need: for passing exams, childbirth, protection from danger, love, good business, or invincibility. Holy Week also attracts folk healers who gather and showcase their amulets' power in the middle of the plaza. Holy Week is believed to be the best time to recharge your anting-anting. Antingeros (talisman aficionados) even go to Mt. Banahaw (believed to be a sacred mountain) on Good Friday to empower it there themselves. Believers of anting-anting claim that the best time to recharge the spiritual energy of their talisman is during the night of Good Friday. Different groups also identify their own special places for 'recharging' their amulets: cemeteries, mountain tops, churches, etc. Recharging of anting-anting is usually done through repeatedly chanting Latin incantations (copies of which may also be bought) while holding the talisman.

Procession of Statues
On Holy Wednesday, a procession is held with Paete's 53 images of Christ's life and death. The procession goes through the town's narrow streets en route to the church. It stops three times to give way to the Salubong (meeting) which depicts three scenes of Jesus' passion and in which Paete's "moving saints" take part. These are: the meeting of Christ and Mary, held at the church patio; the wiping of Jesus' face by Veronica, which takes place at Plaza Edesan; and finally, the encounter between Mary and Veronica where the latter shows the miraculous imprints of Christ's face on her cloth. This is held at the town plaza

In San Pablo, the Good Friday procession consists of huge, century-old statues bedecked in fresh flowers. In the old times, the famous processions were that of Saint Bartholomew of Malabon, Binan, Laguna, Pateros and Tuguegarao. Unfortunately, the Holy Week Images from Cagayan were destroyed by the war and similarly the Tres Caidas of Binan. In the seventies, the Holy Week Procession of Malabon consisted of 30 silver carrozas. The highlight was the Tres Caidas either from Talleres Maximo or Asuncion. It today does no longer join the procession of Good Friday. The most famous procession in Manila during the inter war period was of Santa Cruz. Almost all images were obliterated during the aerial-bombardment of Manila in 1945. Today Makati has a major Holy Wednesday procession aside from the usual Good Friday one, both of which have some of the oldest images and is held in the city proper.

Passion plays

Senákulo
Many towns have their own versions of the Senákulo, using traditional scripts that are decades or centuries old. A version is held at the Cultural Center of the Philippines, sponsored by the Department of Tourism. Popular film and televisions stars often join the cast of the play. In Taguig, they popularize the modern version of Jesus Christ Superstar reshown at the Fort Santiago Amphitheater for the benefit of Manileños. In Mexico, Pampanga and Dinalupihan, Bataan, the actor portraying Jesus has been actually nailed to the cross to simulate Christ's passion.

Pagtaltal sa Guimaras
Ang Pagtaltal is a holy Lenten presentation staged on the hillside of Jordan, Guimaras every Good Friday, patterned to Oberammergau in Southern Bavaria, Germany. “Pagtaltal” means to remove. Thus, the drama ends with the removal or bringing down the body of Jesus Christ from the cross and is laid in the arms of the Blessed Virgin Mary, a familiar scene known as the “Pieta” moment, recalling the period when Christ's body was removed from that very cross where he died.

Backed up by a strong Christian community, Jordan has registered its first festival in Pagtaltal sa Jordan, Guimaras, a Good Friday spectacle. This saga of the sufferings of Christ is enacted with intense spirituality, religious realism, theatrical color, and mass appeal that outclass other presentation of similar flavor. The ever increasing throng of spectators, both local and foreign, who brave the summer heat to witness Pagtaltal is a proof of its popularity.

Moriones Festival
The Moriones Festival in the island province of Marinduque commemorates the story of the Roman centurion, Longinus (Tagalog: San Longhino) and his legendary conversion at the foot of the cross.

The Moriones Festival is a synthesis of Catholicism and folk mysticism. The townsfolk of Boac, Gasan and Mogpog are dressed in masks and helmets (moriones), depicting Roman soldiers. The rest of the locals portray St. Longinus and hide among the houses while the others search for him. Unlike most of the country, Marinduque observe Holy Week in a much more joyous manner.

Salubong

Salubung in Pasig

In one book written by an American, the author observed that the Easter Sunday Procession of the Immaculate Conception Cathedral in Pasig was the most beautiful one. Since Pasig is older than the other towns of the former Province of Tondo, it was suggested that the Pasig ceremony inspired those in Makati, Parañaque and other towns which had Augustinian parishes. Two processions emerged from the church and met in front of the town or city plaza or in a designated place assigned in the area, wherein Mother and Son greeted each other to the tune of Regina Coeli sung by children.

Saboy
The Saboy is a traditional dance performed by girls on Easter Sunday in Las Piñas, Metro Manila. The dance is divided into two parts, the "mourning" section and the "joyful" version.

The first dancer is the Salubong Angel, who often has large wings and bears a black veil. Second are the Hosanna Angels dressed in white, who usually hold baskets with rose petals and comprise a majority of the dancers.

Third are the Tres Marías (English: Three Marys), three older girls dressed in pink and also bearing baskets. Last are the blue-clad Kapitana (Captainess) and Tinyentera (Female Lieutenant); the Kapitana can be distinguished by the large banner she waves, while the Tinyentera swings a thurible.

Sayaw ng Pagbatì
The Salubong is also held in Parañaque City, but with the Mass followed by different renditions of the Sayaw ng Pagbatì ("Dance at the Greeting"), the official city cultural dance.

Called “Sayaw ng Pagbati” (Welcome dance) or “Bati-bati” for short, this ritual dancing shows up to what pious length the local faithful are prepared to take just to tell the world that “Christ is risen”.

On Easter Sunday morning right after mass and the “Salubong” (Encounter) between the images of the Risen Christ and the Blessed Mother, beribboned girls from the various barangays of Parañaque clad in white gowns file in front of St. Andrew's Cathedral in La Huerta village for a street dance showdown. Taking their cue from the marching bands or from a recording, they will dance for hours till noon to the tune of joyful music as they wave their wands in the air.

See also

 Binignit
 Black Nazarene
 Good Friday processions in Baliwag
 Holy Week in Paete
 Hispanic influence on Filipino culture
 Pasyon

External links

 Good Friday traditions, solemn rites held today Holy Wednesday Focuses On Judas’ Betrayal Of Jesus 
 Baliwag processions
 Tourists witness Good Friday procession in Baliwag
 Online Visita Iglesia

References

 
Philippines
Christian festivals in the Philippines